Kingsport: The City in the Mists is a supplement published by Chaosium in 1991 for the horror role-playing game Call of Cthulhu that describes a mysterious Massachusetts city.

Description
Kingsport: The City in the Mists is a setting book which details the Massachusetts city of Kingsport. The book covers the village's dark history, notable Lovecraftian personalities and various points of interest. The book also includes three adventures set in the city:
 The House on the Edge of Dreams: Following a storm, a house disappears.
 Dreams & Muses: Investigation following the suicide of a young artist.
 The Deadly Waters: Several mysterious disappearances at sea.

Publication history
Chaosium first published the horror role-playing game Call of Cthulhu in 1977, and followed up with many adventures and supplements, including a series of "tour guides" of various locales that could be used by gamemasters as campaign or adventure settings, including Green and Pleasant Land (1987), Arkham Unveiled (1990), Return to Dunwich (1991), and Kingsport: The City in the Mists, a 120-page softcover book designed by Kevin A. Ross with contributions by Keith Herber and Scott Aniolowski, interior art by Gus DiZerega, Jason Eckhardt, and Carol Triplett-Smith, and cover art by John T. Snyder. Chaosium published it in 1991.

Reception
In Issue 186 of Dragon (October 1992), Rick Swan called the level of detail included in this book "lavish". However, he thought the three adventures, while they "make good use of the seaside setting," all relied "too heavily on dreams and not enough on Mythos-related encounters." Despite this, he recommended the book, saying, "Player characters will find plenty to do just wandering the streets and knocking on doors."

Other reviews
The Unspeakable Oath #4 (Fall, 1991 Digest)
White Wolf #30 (Feb., 1992)

References

Call of Cthulhu (role-playing game) supplements
Role-playing game supplements introduced in 1991